Beehive Hill is an ice-covered hill in Antarctica, which rises to  and projects  above the surrounding ice sheet. It was first surveyed in 1940 by the United States Antarctic Service, on whose field charts the hill is labeled "Sphinx", and re-surveyed in 1946 by the Falkland Islands Dependencies Survey who gave the present name because of the hill's resemblance to a wicker beehive.

References 

Hills of Graham Land
Fallières Coast